2019 CAF Champions League may refer to:

 2018–19 CAF Champions League
 2019–20 CAF Champions League